is a railway freight terminal in Hōfu, Yamaguchi, Japan, operated by Japan Freight Railway Company (JR Freight).

Lines
Hōfu Freight Terminal is situated on the Sanyō Main Line between Tonomi and Hōfu stations.

History
The terminal was opened in 1986.

Railway stations in Yamaguchi Prefecture
Stations of Japan Freight Railway Company
Sanyō Main Line
Railway freight terminals in Japan
Railway stations in Japan opened in 1986
Hōfu, Yamaguchi